"Unforgettable" is a song by German DJ and record producer Robin Schulz and American singer-songwriter Marc Scibilia. The song was released on 22 December 2017 as the fourth single from his third studio album, Uncovered (2017). The song was written by Dennis Bierbrodt, Jürgen Dohr, Guido Kramer, Stefan Dabruck, Nolan Sipe, Robin Schulz and Marc Scibilia.

Background
Talking to Billboard about the song, Schulz said, "'Unforgettable' is one of my favorite tracks on my third album Uncovered because of the way it builds up. It's very intense but also danceable, and Marc Scibilia's voice adds very well to the atmosphere of the song. I hope people will like it as much as I do!"

Music video
The official music video of the song was released on 19 January 2018 through Robin Schulz's YouTube account. The music video was directed by Maxim Rosenbauer and Moritz Ross.

Track listing

Charts

Weekly charts

Year-end charts

Certifications

References

2017 singles
2017 songs
Robin Schulz songs
Songs written by Jürgen Dohr
Songs written by Robin Schulz
Songs written by Nolan Sipe